Regina Elphinstone-Centre is a provincial electoral district for the Legislative Assembly of Saskatchewan, Canada.

The constituency and its predecessors have been the most reliable in the province for the NDP (and its predecessor the CCF), having elected members of the party continuously since 1944.

Members of the Legislative Assembly

Election results

References

External links 
Website of the Legislative Assembly of Saskatchewan
Map of Regina Elphinstone riding as of 2016

Politics of Regina, Saskatchewan
Saskatchewan provincial electoral districts